Procharista ranongensis is a moth in the family Lecithoceridae. It was described by Kyu-Tek Park in 2009. It is found in Thailand.

The wingspan is about 13.5 mm. The forewings are uniform yellowish brown, clothed with cloudy whitish scales along the veins. The hindwings are uniform clothed with brownish short hair-like scales, with well developed orange-white hair-pencils along the costa basally.

Etymology
The species name is derived from the type locality.

References

Moths described in 2009
Procharista